Fadluraghman "Fadlu" Davids (born 21 May 1981 in Cape Town, Western Cape) is a retired South African football (soccer) striker who last played for Premier Soccer League club Maritzburg United. He was twice the highest goalscorer in the South African National First Division.

Since his retirement in 2012 Davids has served as assistant coach to Ernst Middendorp at Maritzburg United. When Middendorp left Martizburg United in 2016, Davids was named interim coach of Maritzburg for a third time in his career. His brother, Maahier Davids, was named as his assistant.

Upon the arrival of Roger De Sá, Davids resumed his position as Maritzburg's assistant coach. However, only seven games later, he reclaimed his position as interim coach after De Sá's resignation. Davids was caretaker for the rest of the 2016–17 South African Premier Division. On 1 July, Maritzburg United  announced that Fadlu Davids would be the permanent coach after a very good performance as caretaker; he was in charge for the final nine games of the season, winning four, drawing three and losing two. Davids first full season as a coach was a success united were 4 points away from going to the 2018–19 CAF Confederation Cup and they also lost in the finals of the 2017–18 Nedbank Cup which was their last chance to qualify for the CAF tournament. Davids team played 15 league games and only won once, and on 24 December, Maritzburg United sacked Davids. Davids returned to be an assistant coach, this time for Orlando Pirates F.C., and has been in that position since 15 January 2019.

Davids has gained a reputation for promoting younger players after creating first team opportunities for the likes of Siphesihle Ndlovu‚ Bandile Shandu and Mlondi Dlamini, all of whom started out as ball boys.
Joined Maritzburg United: 2007
Previous clubs: Silver Stars; Vasco Da Gama; Manning Rangers; Santos Cape Town; Chernomorets Burgas, Bulgaria; Avendale Athletico, Mother City

References

1981 births
Living people
Sportspeople from Cape Town
South African people of Malay descent
South African soccer players
Association football forwards
Platinum Stars F.C. players
Santos F.C. (South Africa) players
Maritzburg United F.C. players
Manning Rangers F.C. players